"Suffer the Children" is a song by the British band Tears for Fears. Written and sung by Roland Orzabal and released in October 1981, it was the band's first release, recorded shortly after the break-up of Orzabal and Curt Smith's previous band Graduate. The original single was produced by David Lord and recorded at his own facility, Crescent Studios in Bath, England. The song would eventually be re-recorded for inclusion on Tears for Fears' debut LP The Hurting (1983), this time produced by Chris Hughes and Ross Cullum.

Origins and production

Along with "Pale Shelter", "Suffer the Children" was one of two demo songs that landed Tears for Fears their first record deal with Phonogram in 1981.

According to Orzabal:

The song was later re-recorded by producers Chris Hughes and Ross Cullum for inclusion on the band's debut album The Hurting in 1983. This recording is distinct from the original 7" version by the subtraction of an extra Curt Smith-sung lyric at the beginning of the song. Both the original version and re-recording of the song notably feature Orzabal's wife Caroline on a "child vocal" during the bridge.

Release and reissue

"Suffer The Children" was released as a United Kingdom-only single in both 7" and 12" formats. The 7" features the original recording of the song, while the 12" features both remix and instrumental versions. Both formats featured a short B-side, "Wino", which, minus synthesizers or production of any sort, was uncharacteristic of the band's body of work at the time. Despite being added to the playlists of influential Radio 1 disc jockeys John Peel and Peter Powell, the single failed to chart.

In 1985, following the massive success of the band's second album Songs from the Big Chair, Phonogram Records reissued the single complete with a new variation of the original picture sleeve. Featuring the same formats and track listings as the original 1981 release, the single was moderately successful, barely missing the UK Top 50.

No music video was produced for the song.

All three original single variations of "Suffer the Children" (plus "Wino") remained unreleased on compact disc until the 30th anniversary reissue of The Hurting in 2013.

Reception
Sunie Fletcher of Record Mirror called the song an "OMD-ish ditty", adding, "I don't doubt their sincerity, but kind thoughts do not a pop song make, nor well-meant words a hit. Still, it makes a change from exegesis."

Track listings

7": Mercury / IDEA1 (United Kingdom)
 "Suffer the Children" (3:36)
 "Wino" (2:17)

12": Mercury / IDEA12 (United Kingdom)
 "Suffer the Children [Remix]" (4:15)
 "Suffer the Children [Instrumental]" (4:26)
 "Wino" (2:17)

Chart positions

Other appearances
Having often cited Tears for Fears as an influence in interviews, British synthpop act La Roux incorporated "Suffer the Children" into their mix compilation Sidetracked in 2010.

In 2018, the Greek duo Marsheaux covered "Suffer the Children" as contribution to a 2-CD various artists compilation album called The Electricity Club.

References 

Songs about children
Tears for Fears songs
1981 debut singles
Songs written by Roland Orzabal
Song recordings produced by Ross Cullum
Song recordings produced by Chris Hughes (record producer)
1981 songs